The Little Misema River is a river in Timiskaming District and Cochrane District in Northeastern Ontario, Canada. It is in the Saint Lawrence River drainage basin and is a left tributary of the Misema River.

Course
The river begins at the mouth of Little Misema Lake in geographic Ben Nevis Township in Cochrane District. Little Misema Lake is also in the Pushkin Hills, part of the Blake River Megacaldera Complex. The river exits the lake at the east, travels southwest into Timiskaming District, and reaches its mouth at Misema Lake on the Misema River in Katrine Township. The Misema River flows via the Blanche River and Ottawa River to the Saint Lawrence River.

See also
Misema River
List of rivers of Ontario

References

Sources

Rivers of Timiskaming District
Rivers of Cochrane District